Cham Seyyedi may refer to:

Cham Seyyedi-ye Olya
Cham Seyyedi-ye Sofla
Cham Seyyedi-ye Vosta